Kulykol is a lake in Kamysty District, Kostanay Region, Kazakhstan. The lake lies near the Kazakhstan–Russia border.

Kulykol is part of the Kulykol-Taldykol Lake System, a  Ramsar site since 2009. The name of the lake comes from the Kazakh "Қулы/көл", meaning "swan/lake".

Geography
Kulykol is an elongated lake, stretching roughly from NNE to SSW. It is part of the right bank of the upper course of the Tobol basin.

Fauna
Part of the shore of the lake is covered with reeds. The Kulykol-Taldykol Lake System, of which the lake is a part, is a critical site for the nesting, migration and molting of wetland bird species, including the critically endangered siberian crane. 
The lake is rich in fish and local residents do small-scale fishing in it. There are also small mammal species living near the lake, such as the muskrat.

See also
List of lakes of Kazakhstan
List of Ramsar Wetlands of International Importance

References

External links
Kulykol-Taldykol Lake System - BirdLife Data Zone
Kazakhstan, National Report, 2021

Lakes of Kazakhstan
Kostanay Region
Kazakhstan–Russia border